Grouse, also known as Grouse Flat, is an unincorporated community in Wallowa County, Oregon, located less than a mile south of the border with Washington.

History
The town was named for the abundance of grouse in the area. The Grouse post office was established on January 28, 1896, and Samuel M. Silver was the first postmaster.

References

Unincorporated communities in Wallowa County, Oregon
Unincorporated communities in Oregon
1896 establishments in Oregon
Populated places established in 1896